Richard Loo (October 1, 1903 – November 20, 1983) was an American film actor who was one of the most familiar Asian character actors in American films of the 1930s and 1940s. He appeared in more than 120 films between 1931 and 1982.

Early life
Chinese by ancestry and Hawaiian by birth, Loo spent his youth in Hawaii, then moved to California as a teenager. He graduated from the University of California at Berkeley and began a career in business.

Career
The stock market crash of 1929 and the subsequent economic depression forced Loo to start over. He became involved with amateur, then professional, theater companies and in 1931 made his first film. Like most Asian actors in non-Asian countries, he played primarily small, stereotypical roles, though he rose quickly to familiarity, if not fame, in a number of films.

His stern features led him to be a favorite movie villain, and the outbreak of World War II gave him greater prominence in roles as vicious Japanese soldiers in such successful pictures as The Purple Heart (1944) and God Is My Co-Pilot (1945). Loo was most often typecast as the Japanese enemy pilot, spy or interrogator during World War II. In the film The Purple Heart he  plays a Japanese Imperial Army general who commits suicide because he cannot break down the American prisoners. According to his daughter, Beverly Jane Loo, he didn't mind being typecast as a villain in these movies as he felt very patriotic about playing those parts. He was also considered an "atmosphere" player along with Spencer Chan, Willie Fung and Frank Chew.

In 1944 he appeared as a Chinese army lieutenant opposite Gregory Peck in The Keys of the Kingdom.  He had a rare heroic role as a war-weary Japanese-American soldier in Samuel Fuller's Korean War classic The Steel Helmet (1951), but he spent much of the latter part of his career performing stock roles in films and minor television roles.

In 1974 he appeared as the Thai billionaire tycoon Hai Fat in the James Bond film The Man with the Golden Gun, opposite Roger Moore and Christopher Lee.

Loo was also a teacher of Shaolin monks in three episodes of the 1972–1975 hit TV series Kung Fu and made a further three appearances as a different character.  His last acting appearance was in The Incredible Hulk TV series in 1981, but he continued to act in Toyota commercials into 1982. He died of a cerebral hemorrhage on November 20, 1983.

Personal life
Loo's first wife, Bessie Sue, was a well-known Hollywood agent. They had twin daughters Angela Marie Loo and Beverly Jane Loo. Beverly Loo was prominent in publishing, while Angela Loo Levy was a Hollywood agent and accomplished ski patroller. Richard Loo remained with his second wife, Hope, until his death in 1983 at the age of 80. He had a stepdaughter, Christel Hope Mintz.

Filmography

 War Correspondent (1932) as Bandit (uncredited)
 The Secrets of Wu Sin (1932) as Charlie San
 The Bitter Tea of General Yen (1933) as Capt. Li
 Now and Forever (1934) as Hotel clerk (uncredited)
 Student Tour (1934) as Geisha's customer (uncredited)
 The Painted Veil (1934) as Chinese peasant (uncredited)
 Limehouse Blues (1934) as Customer at Harry Young's (uncredited)
 The Mysterious Mr. Wong (1934) as Bystander outside store (uncredited)
 Stranded (1935) as Chinese groom (uncredited)
 Captured in Chinatown (1935) as Ling hatchet man (uncredited)
 Shadows of the Orient (1935) as Yung Yow - Chinese henchman (uncredited)
 China Seas (1935) as Chinese inspector at gangplank (uncredited)
 Roaming Lady (1936) as Chinese man (uncredited)
 Shadow of Chinatown (1936 serial) as Loo, Chinese man on street ( Chapters 5–7) (uncredited)
 Mad Holiday (1936) as Li Yat (uncredited)
 Stowaway (1936) as Chinese merchant (uncredited)
 After the Thin Man (1936) as Lichee Club headwaiter (uncredited)
 The Good Earth (1937) as Chinese farmer (uncredited)
 Lost Horizon (1937) as Shanghai airport official (uncredited)
 The Soldier and the Lady (1937) as Tartar (uncredited)
 The Singing Marine (1937) as Shanghai hotel official (uncredited)
 Outlaws of the Orient (1937) as General (uncredited)
 That Certain Woman (1937) as Elevator operator (uncredited)
 West of Shanghai (1937) as Mr. Cheng
 Thank You, Mr. Moto (1937) as Cop at shooting site (uncredited)
 Blondes at Work (1938) as Sam Wong (uncredited)
 Too Hot to Handle (1938) as Charlie (uncredited)
 Shadows Over Shanghai (1938) as Fong
 North of Shanghai (1939) as Jed's Pilot
 Panama Patrol (1939) as Tommy Young
 Mr. Wong in Chinatown (1939) as Tong chief
 Miracles for Sale (1939) as Chinese soldier in demo (uncredited)
 Lady of the Tropics (1939) as Delaroch's chauffeur (uncredited)
 Island of Lost Men (1939) as Gen. Ahn Ling
 Daughter of the Tong (1939) as Wong, hotel clerk
 Barricade (1939) as Colonel, commander of the rescue party (uncredited)
 The Fatal Hour (1940) as Jeweler 
 Doomed to Die (1940) as Tong leader
 Ellery Queen's Penthouse Mystery (1941) as Henchman (uncredited)
 They Met in Bombay (1941) as Japanese officer (uncredited)
 Secrets of the Wasteland (1941) as Quan
 A Yank on the Burma Road (1942) as Commandant (uncredited)
 Star Spangled Rhythm (1942) as Emperor Hirohito (uncredited)
 Remember Pearl Harbor (1942) as Mandolin playing Japanese radioman (uncredited)
 Submarine Raider (1942) as Chauffeur Suji (uncredited)
 Bombs Over Burma (1942) as Col. Kim
 Little Tokyo, U.S.A. (1942) as Oshima
 Wake Island (1942) as Mr. Saburo Kurusu (uncredited)
 Across the Pacific (1942) as First Officer Miyuma
 Manila Calling (1942) as Filipino (uncredited)
 Flying Tigers (1942) as Dr. Tsing (uncredited)
 Road to Morocco (1942) as Chinese announcer (uncredited)
 City Without Men (1943) as Japanese spy (uncredited)
 Flight for Freedom (1943) as Mr. Yokahata (uncredited)
 The Amazing Mrs. Holliday (1943) as General Chan (uncredited)
 The Falcon Strikes Back (1943) as Jerry
 China (1943) as Lin Yun
 Yanks Ahoy (1943) as Japanese submarine officer (uncredited)
 Behind the Rising Sun (1943) as Japanese officer dispensing opium (uncredited)
 Destroyer (1943) as Japanese submarine commander (uncredited)
 So Proudly We Hail! (1943) as Japanese radio announcer (voice, uncredited)
 Jack London (1943) as Japanese Ambassador (uncredited)
 Rookies in Burma (1943) as Colonel Matsuda (uncredited)
 The Purple Heart (1944) as Gen. Ito Mitsubi
 The Story of Dr. Wassell (1944) as Chinese doctor on train (uncredited)
 The Keys of the Kingdom (1944) as Lt. Shon
 Betrayal from the East (1945) as Lt. Cmdr. Miyazaki, alias Tani
 God Is My Co-Pilot (1945) as Tokyo Joe
 China Sky (1945) as Col. Yasuda
 China's Little Devils (1945) as Colonel Huraji
 Back to Bataan (1945) as Maj. Hasko
 First Yank into Tokyo (1945) as Col. Hideko Okanura
 Prison Ship (1945) as Capt. Osikawa
 Tokyo Rose (1946) as Colonel Suzuki
 The Beginning or the End (1947) as Japanese officer (uncredited)
 Seven Were Saved (1947) as Colonel Yamura
 Web of Danger (1947) as Wing
 Beyond Our Own (1947, Short) as James Wong 
 Women in the Night (1948) as Col. Noyama
 To the Ends of the Earth (1948) as Commissioner Lu (uncredited)
 Half Past Midnight (1948) as Lee Gow 
 The Cobra Strikes (1948) as Hyder Ali
 The Golden Eye (1948) as Undetermined Secondary Role (scenes deleted)
 Rogues' Regiment (1948) as Kao Pang
 State Department: File 649 (1949) as Marshal Yun Usu
 The Clay Pigeon (1949) as Ken Tokoyama aka The Weasel
 Malaya (1949) as Colonel Genichi Tomura
 The Steel Helmet (1951) as Sgt. Tanaka
 Chinatown Chump (1951, Short) as Chinese counterfeiter
 Operation Pacific (1951) as Japanese fighter pilot (uncredited)
 I Was an American Spy (1951) as Col. Masamato
 5 Fingers (1952) as Japanese Ambassador (uncredited)
 Target Hong Kong (1953) as Fu Chao
 Destination Gobi (1953) as Commanding Officer, Japanese POW camp (uncredited)
 China Venture (1953) as Chang Sung
 Hell and High Water (1954) as Hakada Fujimori
 The Shanghai Story (1954) as Junior officer
 Living It Up (1954) as Dr. Lee
 The Bamboo Prison (1954) as Commandant Hsai Tung
 Soldier of Fortune (1955) as General Po Lin
 House of Bamboo (1955) as Inspector Kita (dubbing Sessue Hayakawa, uncredited)
 Love is a Many-Splendored Thing (1955) as Robert Hung
 The Conqueror (1956) as Captain of Wang's guard
 Around the World in 80 Days (1956) as Hong Kong saloon manager (uncredited)
 Battle Hymn (1957) as Gen. Kim
 The Quiet American (1957) as Mr. Heng
 Hong Kong Affair (1958) as Li Noon
 The Scavengers (1959)
 Espionage: Far East (1961)
 Seven Women from Hell (1961) as Sgt. Takahashi
 Confessions of an Opium Eater (1962) as George Wah
 A Girl Named Tamiko (1962) as Otani
 Diamond Head (1962) as Yamagata (uncredited)
 The Sand Pebbles (1966) as Major Chin
 One More Time (1970) (uncredited)
 Which Way to the Front? (1970) as Japanese naval officer (uncredited)
 One More Train to Rob (1971) as Mr.Chang
 Chandler (1971) as Leo
 The Man with the Golden Gun (1974) as Hai Fat

Television
Summer Theater 1 episode (Foo Young) (1953)
Fireside Theater 2 episodes (I Cover Korea) (1953) (Major Chang in The Traitor) (1953)
December Bride 1 episode (The Chinese Dinner) (1954) as Client
My Little Margie 1 episode (San Francisco Story) (1954) as Mr. Tang
Cavalcade of America 2 episodes (Ordeal in Burma) (1954) (Ho Chung in Diplomatic Outpost) (1956)
TV Reader's Digest 2 episodes (Officer in The Brainwashing of John Hayes) (1955) (Lew Gar Mun in The Smuggler) (1956)
Navy Log 1 episode (Dr. Van) (1956) as General Hashimoto
Crossroads 1 episode (Calvary in China) (1956) as Colonel
The Man Called X 1 episode (Assassination) (1956)
Four Star Playhouse 1 episode (Wall of Bamboo) (1956) as Jo-Kai
Tombstone Territory 1 episode (Tong War) (1958) as Quong Key
Hong Kong 2 episodes (Low in The Jade Empress) (1960) (Thug in Suitable for Framing) (1961)
Maverick 1 episode (The Golden Fleecing) (1961) as Lee Hong Chang
Follow the Sun 1 episode (The Woman Who Never Was) (1961) as District Attorney
Bonanza 1 episode (Day of the Dragon) (1961) as General Mu Tsung
The Beachcomber 1 episode (Charlie Six Kids) (1962) as Ah Wei 
Hawaiian Eye 1 episode (Two Too Many) (1963) as C.K. Yang
The Dakotas 1 episode (The Chooser of the Slain) (1963) as George Yang
The Outer Limits 1 episode (The Hundred Days of the Dragon) (1963) as Li-Chin Sung
Wagon Train 1 episode (The Widow O'Rourke Story) (1963) as Liu Yang
Perry Mason 1 episode (The Case of the Floating Stones) (1963) as Mr. Eng 
I Spy 1 episode (So Long, Patrick Henry) (1965) as Mr. Tsung 
Honey West 1 episode (The Owl and the Eye) (1965) as Tog-Chinese fine arts thief
Voyage to the Bottom of the Sea 1 episode (Timebomb) (1965) as Li Tung 
Burke's Law 1 episode (Deadlier Than the Male) (1965) as Grass Slipper
The Wackiest Ship in the Army 2 episodes (Admiral Osuma in The Lamb Who Hunted Wolves: Parts I & II) (1966)
The Wild Wild West 1 episode (The Night the Dragon Screamed) (1966) as Wang Chung
I Dream of Jeannie 1 episode (Jeannie and the Kidnap Caper) (1966) as Wong
The Man from U.N.C.L.E. 1 episode (The Indian Affairs Affair) (1966) as Dr. Yahama
Family Affair 1 episode (The Mother Tongue) (1967) as Mr. Chen
My Three Sons 1 episode (Weekend in Paradise) (1967) as Mr. Chang
Hawaii Five-O 1 episode (Twenty-Four Karat Kill) (1968) as Wong Tou
It Takes a Thief 3 episodes (Clown in A Case of Red Turnips) (1968) (Dr. Langpoor in Payoff in the Piazza) (1969) (Wong in Project X) (1970) 
Marcus Welby, M.D. 1 episode (A Matter of Humanities) (1969) as Kenji Yamashita
Here Comes the Brides 1 episode (Marriage, Chinese Style) (1969) as Chi Pei
Bewitched 1 episode (Samantha's Better Halves) (1970) as Mr. Tanaka
The Sixth Sense 1 episode (With This Ring, I Thee Kill) (1972) as MatsuoThe Delphi Bureau 1 episode (The Deadly Little Errand) (1972) as Shen SiKung Fu 6 episodes (Master Sun in Pilot (1972) Blood Brother (1973) Besieged: Cannon at the Gates (1974)) (Chen in The Tong) (1973) (Wu Chang in Arrogant Dragon) (1974) (Ho Fai, the weapons master in The Devil's Champion) (1974)
Ironside 1 episode (In the Forests of the Night) (1973) as Lin Chu Tai
McCloud 1 episode (The Solid Gold Swingers) (1973) as Y.S. Chen (uncredited)
Owen Marshall: Counselor at Law 1 episode (The Attacker) (1974) as Tanaka
Collision Course: Truman vs. MacArthur TV movie (1976) as Chiang-Kai-Shek
The Quest 1 episode (Welcome to America, Jade Snow) (1976) as Dr. Li Po
Police Story 1 episode (The Blue Fog) (1977) as Eddie Lee
The Hardy Boys/Nancy Drew Mysteries 1 episode (The Secret of the Jade Kwan Yin) (1977) as Chen Lee
The Incredible Hulk 1 episode (East Winds) (1981) as Kam Chong (final appearance)

References

External links

Richard Loo Papers at the University of Wyoming - American Heritage Center
Groundbreaking Character Actor Richard Loo on the AHC blog

20th-century American male actors
American male film actors
American male television actors
People from Maui County, Hawaii
1903 births
1983 deaths
Burials at San Fernando Mission Cemetery
Male actors from Hawaii
University of California, Berkeley alumni
Hawaii people of Chinese descent